The Oklahoma City Blazers were a professional ice hockey team based in Oklahoma City, Oklahoma, that played in the Central Hockey League. The Blazers played at the Ford Center, located in downtown Oklahoma City. On July 2, 2009, the Blazers ceased operations after failing to reach a lease agreement with the city.

From 2010 to 2015, the market was served by the Oklahoma City Barons, an American Hockey League team playing at Cox Convention Center as the top affiliate of the National Hockey League's Edmonton Oilers.

History
In 1992, a new Central Hockey League began play in the same territory as the older league. It also acquired several team names in tribute to the former CHL, including the Oklahoma City Blazers. The new Blazers began play in the Myriad Convention Center, the same home arena as the old team.

They averaged 9,128 fans per game over 17 seasons. The franchise led the CHL in attendance in each of its 17 seasons in the league. On the ice, the Blazers excelled as well, winning nine regular season division championships (including seven straight from 1996 to 2003), five regular season points titles, and CHL championships in 1996 and 2001. The franchise's two greatest stars, Joe Burton and Hardy Sauter, are the CHL's first and third all-time career leading scorers.

In 2002, the Blazers changed their home venue to the new Ford Center.

In 2009, the Blazers withdrew their application a lease extension with the Ford Center and ceased operations. It was reported at the time that city officials were in negotiations with the American Hockey League for an expansion franchise. Following months of speculation, Oklahoma City was granted an AHL franchise on February 10, 2010, when the NHL's Edmonton Oilers reactivated their dormant affiliate and created the Oklahoma City Barons. They began play in the 2010–11 season in the smaller Cox Convention Center (formerly the Myriad) and the team was operated by the former owner of the Blazers, Bob Funk.

John Brooks, the radio play-by-play voice for the University of Oklahoma football and men's basketball teams from 1978 to 1991 and of the original Blazers hockey team, was the on-air play-by-play voice of the relaunched Blazers, however he would split the play-by-play duties with then Oklahoma City 89ers voice Brian Barnhart for the 1992-93 season only before becoming the full-time play-by-play voice of the team in the 1993-94 season. Brooks semi-retired from the Blazers after 2004–05 season after 27 seasons in total for both franchises. Brooks was inducted into the Blazers Hall of Fame on March 11, 2005. After 2004–05 season, Brooks was succeeded by Jim Byers who was the then play-by-play voice for the Oklahoma Redhawks and the occasional substitute play-by-play voice of the Blazers in place of Brooks for several years when Brooks was unavailable or handling the play-by-play duties for televised Blazer games. Jim Byers also served as a linesman in then revived Central Hockey League from 1992-1995. Following his semi-retirement from full-time play-by-play, Brooks would return to call a few games and playoffs in the following seasons when Jim Byers was handing the play-by-play duties (In a bit of a so-called swap or role reverse with Brooks as was in years prior.) when select Blazers games against the Tulsa Oilers were televised via Cox Cable Oklahoma channel 7 (Simulcasted on Cox Cable Oklahoma channel 3 in Tulsa.) or was unavailable due to the start of the Oklahoma RedHawks seasons.

Championships

Seasons

Personnel

Head coaches

Retired numbers
19 – Joe Burton
27 – John Brooks, play-by-play broadcaster

General managers
Brad Lund, 1992–2000
Chris Presson, 2000–2004
DeBray Ayala, 2004–2009

References

External links
 Oklahoma City Blazers Official Site 

Defunct Central Hockey League teams
Ice hockey teams in Oklahoma
Ice hockey clubs established in 1992
Ice hockey clubs disestablished in 2009
1992 establishments in Oklahoma
2009 disestablishments in Oklahoma
Sports in Oklahoma City